Funalia is a fungal genus in the family Polyporaceae. The genus was circumscribed by French mycologist Narcisse Théophile Patouillard in 1900. He made Funalia mons-veneris the type species; this fungus was originally described as Polyporus mons-veneris by Franz Wilhelm Junghuhn in 1838. The generic name is derived from the Latin funalis ("made of rope").

Species
Funalia argentea (Lloyd) D.A.Reid (1973)
Funalia aspera (Jungh.) Zmitr. & Malysheva (2013)
Funalia caperata (Berk.) Zmitr. & Malysheva (2013)
Funalia floccosa (Jungh.) Zmitr. & Malysheva (2013)
Funalia funalis (Fr.) Pat. (1900)
Funalia sanguinaria (Klotzsch) Zmitr. & Malysheva (2013)
Funalia subgallica Hai J.Li & S.H.He (2016) – China
Funalia thujae (J.D.Zhao) Y.C.Dai & H.S.Yuan (2010) – China

References

Polyporaceae
Polyporales genera
Taxa described in 1900
Taxa named by Narcisse Théophile Patouillard